Uderna is a village in Elva Parish, Tartu County in southern Estonia. It has a population of 61 (as of 1 January 2005).

Uderna Manor
Uderna manor is mentioned for the first time in 1486 and belonged to the Tiesenhausen family during the Middle Ages. The current building dates from the 18th century but was substantially rebuilt around 1880 to its present look.

Notable people
Helmi Mäelo (1898–1978), writer and social activist
Olav Roots (1910-1974), composer

See also
 List of palaces and manor houses in Estonia

References

Villages in Tartu County
Kreis Dorpat